"The New Advocate" (German: "Der neue Advokat") is a short story by Franz Kafka. It is a very brief piece that illustrates Kafka's view of lawyers. A firm has hired a new associate, Bucephalos. The narrator realizes that times have changed, but hopes that people will hold back on any judgement and accept this new associate for who he is, and what he is capable of.

One scholar has suggested that this story and Kafka's letters illustrate his distaste for the legal profession.

References

Short stories by Franz Kafka